Torbanist may refer to:

A person who plays the torban
List of torbanists